ISSAT may refer to:

 Institute of Space, its Applications and Technologies, a French association
 Tis Issat, a waterfall on the Blue Nile river in Ethiopia